Birol Parlak (born 1 March 1990) is a Turkish footballer who plays for Balıkesirspor.

References

External links
  at Eses
 

1990 births
Living people
People from Pazar, Rize
Turkish footballers
Association football defenders
Association football midfielders
Tepecikspor footballers
Fethiyespor footballers
Eskişehirspor footballers
Kayserispor footballers
Alanyaspor footballers
Ümraniyespor footballers
Süper Lig players
TFF First League players
TFF Second League players